Bruno Manoel Marinho (born 5 July 1984) is a Brazilian footballer who plays for Åtvidabergs FF as a midfielder. He first came to Sweden in 2008 after having previously belonged to Guarani FC and Santos FC in Brazil. In Sweden he started out playing for FC Norrköping in the lower divisions of Swedish football but was quickly discovered by Superettan club Åtvidabergs FF who brought him over on loan. After only a few months he had impressed the club enough for them to sign him on a permanent contract.

References

External links
 
 (archive)
Bruno Marinho at Åtvidabergs FF 

1984 births
Living people
Association football midfielders
Brazilian footballers
Brazilian expatriate footballers
Åtvidabergs FF players
Allsvenskan players
Superettan players
Expatriate footballers in Sweden
Place of birth missing (living people)